Christ Church is a historic Episcopal church at 750 Main Street in Waltham, Massachusetts. The church is a parish of the Episcopal Diocese of Massachusetts, and was named to the National Register of Historic Places in 1989.

The church was founded in 1848, but a local hall was used for services until a wooden church was built in 1849. The wooden structure eventually proved inadequate and a larger church designed by Peabody and Stearns was built of local fieldstone at the current location between 1897 and 1898.

The church contains stained glass windows produced by several noteworthy manufacturers, including Clayton and Bell, Charles Connick, Louis Comfort Tiffany, and Donald MacDonald.  Eight rectors have served the church since its founding.

History 
The community of Christ Church was founded in 1848 by Albert C. Patterson, an Episcopal clergyman and missionary who identified the growing industrial city of Waltham as an ideal place to build a church.  The new Episcopal community met in Rumford Hall (later Waltham City Hall) until a Gothic wooden church was completed on Central Street in Waltham in 1849.  The land for the church and much of its funding was provided by founding member J.S. Copley Greene.

Christ Church's first rector was the Rev. Thomas F. Fales, from St. Paul's Episcopal Church in Brunswick, Maine.  Fales remained the church's rector for more than 40 years, until retiring in 1890. During this time, Christ Church's membership grew from 15 members to more than 400.

At about the time Fales retired, the church outgrew the Central Street building.  In 1892, the parish bought land with the intent of building a larger church at 750 Main Street.  In 1895, the old church building was sold to a French Canadian Roman Catholic community.  Christ Church held services in Waltham's Maynard Hall until the new building could be completed.

In 1896, after four years of planning, the architectural firm of Peabody and Stearns was hired to design the new structure and construction began in the early months of 1897.  Philanthropist and Christ Church senior warden Robert Treat Paine, Jr. signed the contract for construction, and financed much of the building with his own fortune.  Philanthropist sisters and Christ Church parishioners Harriet Sarah and Mary Sophia Walker also contributed significantly to the funding.

The first service in the completed building was held on June 17, 1898.  That Sunday, the retired Rev. Fales delivered the church's inaugural sermon from the wooden pulpit that was his gift to the new building.

The church is a parish of the Episcopal Diocese of Massachusetts, and was named to the National Register of Historic Places in 1989.

Architecture and design

Christ Church was designed by Peabody and Stearns, masters of American Shingle style architecture, and was constructed of native Waltham fieldstone in the English Country style.  The inspiration for the church's stone exterior came indirectly from architect H. H. Richardson, who was also a friend and Harvard classmate of Robert Treat Paine, Jr.  When Paine remodeled and expanded his Waltham home in 1883, it was Richardson who designed the residence that would become Stonehurst, a Shingle style mansion built of glacial stones quarried on site from Paine's estate.  Richardson died in 1886 and played no part in the planning of Christ Church, but it was his Stonehurst design that inspired Robert Treat Paine, Jr. to use the same stones from his property for the exterior of the church.

The church features several stained glass windows of significance. The east window, by Clayton and Bell, was a gift from Robert Treat Paine, Jr. in memory of his wife, Lydia Lyman Paine, who died in 1897 during the construction of the church.  At Paine's request, his wife's likeness was incorporated into the left panel of the window as a red-clad figure kneeling before Christ.  The west window, designed by Charles Connick, pays homage to Waltham's manufacturing history. In addition to images of Ruth, Solomon, and Noah — all industrious figures in the Bible — the window features rivets, a bicycle wheel, a watch escapement, a Metz car, and other symbols that reference Waltham's industrial character.  Along the south wall is a signed Tiffany window, designed by Tiffany artist Frederick Wilson.  The window depicts the Nativity, and was given to the church in 1908 by John H. Storer in memory of Frank Henry Perkins and Mary Ella Perkins.  Also along the south wall is a window by noted Boston stained glass artist Donald MacDonald.  This work, given in memory of Harriet K. Parmenter, depicts the Easter scene of the risen Christ revealing himself to Mary Magdalene.

Rectors

Since its founding, eight clergy have been elected by the Christ Church parish to serve as rector:

 The Rev. Thomas F. Fales (1849–1890)
 The Rev. Herbert Noel Cunningham (1890–1895)
 The Rev. Hubert Wetmore Wells (1896–1900)
 The Rev. Francis Ellsworth Webster (1901–1930)
 The Rev. George O. Ekwall (1930–1960)
 The Rev. John S. Kromer (1961–1970)
 The Rev. William R. Mawhinney (1971–1999)
 The Rev. Sara H. Irwin (2009–2017)
 The Rev. Dr. Kapya John Kaoma (2019–present)

Note: In the intervening years listed above, a priest-in-charge appointed by the bishop served as the leader of the church.

See also
National Register of Historic Places listings in Waltham, Massachusetts

References

External links 

 Official website for the Episcopal Diocese of Massachusetts
 Official website of Christ Church Waltham

Episcopal church buildings in Massachusetts
Churches on the National Register of Historic Places in Massachusetts
Churches in Waltham, Massachusetts
National Register of Historic Places in Waltham, Massachusetts